Immanuel Alm (1767–1809) was a Finnish painter.

Alm's father Johan Alm was also a painter. They both worked on religious-themed paintings, including altarpieces such as one at the church in Kaustinen. The National Museum of Finland also has some of his works.

References

 Some of this material was translated from the Finnish Wikipedia article
  Z. Schalin: Om Nykarleby kyrkas bildskrud, mälarena D. Hjulström samt J. och E. Alm Suomen museolehti 76, 108, 1907, 1

1767 births
1809 deaths
18th-century Finnish painters
18th-century male artists
Finnish male painters
19th-century Finnish painters
19th-century Finnish male artists